The Seymour Expedition was an attempt by a multi-national military force to march to Beijing and relieve the Siege of the Legations and foreign nationals from attacks by government troops and Boxers in 1900.  The Chinese army and Boxer fighters defeated the Seymour armies and forced them to return to Tianjin (Tientsin). It was followed later in the summer by the successful Gaselee Expedition.

Historical background

Boxer bands advanced on Beijing in May and June 1900. The Qing court was ambivalent about the Boxers, fearing that they might become anti-Qing. The Boxers became a serious threat to Western and Japanese citizens, murdering missionaries and Chinese Christians living northern China. The diplomatic legations in Beijing requested that guards be sent to protect them. As such, more than 400 marines and naval troops from eight countries arrived in Beijing on 31 May.  However, as the Boxers began posing a more significant threat, it became apparent that additional troops were needed. On 9 June, Sir Claude Maxwell MacDonald, the British Minister in China, cabled Vice-Admiral Edward Hobart Seymour, commander of the British navy's China Station, that the situation in Beijing was becoming more serious and that troops should be landed with all arrangements made for an advance to Peking [Beijing] at once.

Responding to MacDonald's message, Seymour assembled in 24 hours a force of more than 2,000 sailors and marines from European, American, and Japanese warships. He prepared to embark for Beijing by train from Tianjin, 75 miles away. His force consisted of 916 British, 455 Germans, 326 Russians, 158 French, 112 Americans, 54 Japanese, 41 Italians, and 26 Austrians.  Seymour's Chief of Staff was Capt. John Jellicoe. 

The diplomats in Beijing anticipated that Seymour would arrive on 11 June. They neither requested the imperial court's permission nor informed the court of their intentions. They had, in effect, launched an invasion. That is, in order to enforce international law, in the words of one scholar, the method of enforcing it "consisted in its constant violation." 

The Chinese response was decisive.

Advance toward Beijing
Seymour commandeered five trains in Tianjin and departed for Beijing with his entire force on the morning of 10 June. On the first day, the soldiers travelled 25 miles without incident, crossing a bridge at Yancun over the Hai River unopposed; although Chinese Gen. Nie Shicheng and thousands of his soldiers were camped there, Nie's soldiers were friendly and did not attack. Nie had let Seymour's army slip past because he had deliberately been issued contradictory orders by Ronglu, a Manchu political and military leader who was working to derail the efforts to capture the legations. The next few days went slowly, as Seymour had to repair railroad tracks and fight off Boxer attacks as his trains advanced. On 14 June, several hundred Boxers armed with swords, spears, and clumsy gingals attacked Seymour twice and killed five Italian soldiers. The Americans counted 102 Boxer bodies left on the battlefield at the end of one battle.

The Chinese government had reversed its earlier positions after learning of the invasion, deciding to absorb the Boxer forces and order the army to defend against Seymour's march to the capital.

Battle of Langfang

Gen. Dong Fuxiang, along with his Kansu (Chinese Muslim) Braves, prepared to ambush the invading western army. Gen. Ma Fuxiang and Gen. Ma Fulu personally planned and led the attack, with a pincer movement around the European force. On 18 June, Dong Fuxiang's troops, stationed at Hunting Park in southern Beijing, attacked at multiple points, including Langfang. The force of 5,000 included cavalrymen armed with modern rifles. The foreign troops, especially the Germans, fought off the attack, killing hundreds of Chinese at a loss of seven dead and 57 wounded. The Kansu Braves lost 200 and the Boxers another 200. The need to care for the wounded, a lack of supplies, and the likelihood of additional Chinese attacks led Seymour and his officers to decide to retreat to Tianjin. The Chinese army's unexpected attack on Seymour was a response to the European and Japanese attack on the Dagu Forts two days previously, because of which the Chinese government decided to resist Seymour's army and kill or expel all foreigners in northern China.

During one of the battles at Langfang, Boxers armed with swords and spears charged the British and Americans. The British were armed with .303 Lee–Metford rifles, while the Americans carried with them the M1895 Lee Navy. At point-blank range one British soldier had to fire four bullets into a Boxer before he stopped, and American Capt. Bowman McCalla reported that single rifle shots were not enough: multiple rifle shots were needed to halt a Boxer.

The retreat
Seymour turned his five trains around and headed back toward Tianjin.  However, he found that either the Boxers or the Chinese Army had destroyed the bridge across the Hai River he had crossed previously. The expedition would either have to cross the river by boat and walk 18 miles to Tianjin along the railroad, or follow the river for 30 miles to Tianjin. The sailors, perhaps more comfortable near water, chose to follow the river, even though the railroad route was shorter and ran through open country.  Along the heavily populated river banks were large Boxer forces in villages every one-half mile.

Seymour's retreat down the Hai River was slow and difficult, covering only three miles the first day. Additional casualties included Capt. Jellicoe, who suffered a near-fatal wound.  By 22 June, the soldiers were out of food and down to fewer than 10 rounds of ammunition per man, except for the Americans who had brought ample ammunition. However, they reportedly never considered surrendering.

Seymour's 2,000 soldiers might have perished along the river if not for a chance encounter. On 23 June, six miles from Tianjin, Seymour came across the Chinese army's Xigu fort and arsenal which, inexplicably, was nearly undefended.  The foreign soldiers took refuge in the arsenal, which contained a wealth of arms and ammunition, along with some food.  Realizing their mistake in leaving the arsenal undefended, the Chinese army attempted to dislodge Seymour's forces, which were now well provisioned and so repelled the Chinese attacks.

A Chinese servant of the British slipped through to Tianjin and requested rescue for Seymour. A force of 2,000 soldiers marched out of the city to the arsenal on 25 June, and escorted Seymour's men back to Tianjin the next day. The Chinese did not oppose their passage. A missionary reported their arrival in Tianjin: "I shall never forget to my dying day, the long string of dusty travel-worn soldiers, who for a fortnight had been living on quarter rations, and fighting every day . . . the men were met by kind ladies with pails of tea which the poor fellows drunk as they had never drunk before – some bursting into tears."  Of the initial 2,000 men in the Seymour expedition, there were 62 dead and 232 wounded.

The besieged foreigners in the legations in Beijing, unaware of the defeat of Seymour's forces, still thought that Seymour was almost there and that they would be saved. Even the Chinese government at the time did not know either that their own forces had turned Seymour's armies back.

Assessment
The Seymour expedition was "a serious failure" and a "humiliation". Seymour had underestimated his Chinese opponent, trusting that he could push through to Beijing quickly with little or no opposition.  Instead, "Seymour's expedition became a large moving target for the Boxers and Imperial troops.  The would-be rescuers ... required rescue themselves." The Western and Japanese soldiers and civilians in Beijing were subjected to a 55-day siege by the Boxers and Chinese army. It took more than a month after the Seymour expedition for the Eight-Nation Alliance to organize a larger and better-equipped army to defeat the Chinese and march on Beijing in order to relieve the siege of the legation quarter.

The Boxers charged the foreigners with swords, spears, rifles, and gingals; most of them were boys and common peasants, rather than professional troops. The Boxers sometimes faked death and then sprang back up at the troops to attack; an Allied soldier, Bigham, said they had no "fear" or "hesitation".

The expedition had failed for several reasons. The main reason was the drastic underestimation of Chinese resistance.
The London Spectator pointed out that the expedition was "to embark on the assumption that any force of Europeans however small can beat any force of Chinamen however large." Further reasons include the lack of communication between the expedition and Tianjin-based command, due to the cutting of telegraph lines, the over-reliance on rail transport and lack of preparedness in guarding the railway lines, and the overall lack of strategic planning and vision of Admiral Seymour.

Notes

References

 

 Thompson, Larry Clinton (2009), William Scott Ament and the Boxer Rebellion: Heroism, Hubris, and the Ideal Missionary, Jefferson, NC: McFarland Publishing Company. 

Conflicts in 1900
Battles of the Boxer Rebellion involving the United States
1900 in China
Battles of the Boxer Rebellion
United States Marine Corps in the 20th century
Anti-imperialism in Asia
June 1900 events